Coccothrinax clarensis is a palm which is endemic to central and eastern Cuba. Its name suggests that it has small coconut-like fruit (Greek coccos:berry and thrinax:trident or winnowing fork) while clarensis comes from Santa Clara valley in Cuba where the species are found.

Two subspecies are recognised: Coccothrinax clarensis subsp. brevifolia (León) Borhidi & O.Muñiz and Coccothrinax clarensis subsp. clarensis

Henderson and colleagues (1995) considered C. clarensis subsp. clarensis to be a synonym of Coccothrinax gundlachii and C. clarensis subsp. brevifolia to be a synonym of Coccothrinax pauciramosa.

References

clarensis
Trees of Cuba
Plants described in 1939